The 2015 Renault UK Clio Cup is a multi-event, one make motor racing championship held across England and one event in Scotland. The championship features a mix of professional motor racing teams and privately funded drivers competing in the Clio Renaultsport 200 Turbo EDC that conform to the technical regulations for the championship. It forms part of the extensive program of support categories built up around the BTCC. It will be the 20th Renault Clio Cup United Kingdom season and the 40th of UK motorsport undertaken by Renault and Renault Sport. The first race takes place on 5 April at Brands Hatch on the circuit's Indy configuration and concluded on 11 October at the same venue, utilising the Grand Prix circuit, after eighteen races held at nine meetings.

2014 champion Mike Bushell graduated to the BTCC for 2015 to drive for AmD Tuning.com, with vice-champion Josh Cook joining him at Power Maxed Racing – those two being amongst twelve Clio Cup graduates on the 2015 BTCC entry list.

Teams and drivers
All teams and drivers were British-registered, excepting UAE-registered Tom Grundi and Italian-registered Michele Puccetti.

Race calendar and results
The provisional calendar was announced by the championship organisers on 27 November 2014. Silverstone Circuit returns to the calendar in 2015 at the expense of Snetterton Motor Racing Circuit.

Championship standings

Drivers' championship

Notes
A driver's best 16 scores counted towards the championship, with any other points being discarded.

Teams' championship

Notes

References

External links

Renault Clio Cup UK seasons
Renault Clio Cup UK